MFAP  may stand for:

 MFAP1, Microfibrillar-associated protein 1
 MFAP2, Microfibrillar-associated protein 2
 MFAP3, Microfibrillar-associated protein 3
 MFAP4, Microfibrillar-associated protein 4
 MFAP5, Microfibrillar-associated protein 5